Intelsat 5 (IS-5, PAS-5, Arabsat 2C) was a satellite providing television and communication services for Intelsat, which it was commissioned by in 2006.

Satellite description 
It was manufactured by Hughes Space and Communications. At beginning of life, it generates nearly 10 kilowatts. This version takes advantage of such advances as dual-junction gallium arsenide solar cells, new battery technology and the first commercial use of a high-efficiency xenon ion propulsion system (XIPS).

PanAmSat became HSC's first customer to launch the new model, on 28 August 1997, at 00:33:30 UTC, on a Russian Proton-K / Blok DM-2M launch vehicle from the Baikonur Cosmodrome in Kazakhstan. PAS-5 provides satellite services in the Americas, with access to Europe, including direct-to-home (DTH) television services in Mexico.

Controllers began noticing degradation of the nickel–hydrogen battery in PAS-5 earlier in 1998. The effect on operations was analyzed in June 1998. During periods of peak solar eclipse, which occur twice a year, PanAmSat is required to shut off a portion of the satellite's payload for some time. PanAmSat reportedly received a compensation of US$185 million from its insurers after the satellite was declared a "total loss" because its capacity was reduced by more than 50%.

Arabsat 2C 
PAS 5 was leased in May 2002 to the Arab Satellite Communications Organization (Arabsat), under the name of Arabsat 2C. Arabsat used the spacecraft's C-band transponders to complement its partially defunct Arabsat 3A at 26° East.

The television channels it broadcasts include BBC World News, Australia Network and regular feeds of Entertainment Tonight and The Wall Street Journal Report. As of 28 September 2012, BBC World News was replaced with a static video slate advising that the service would be only available on the existing horizontally aligned lower powered Pacific beam on Intelsat 19 which is 3.94 GHz.

Intelsat 5 
Intelsat 5 was moved at 169° East and has been broadcasting Australia Network Pacific on the horizontally aligned Pacific Beam 4.1 GHz when went silent and was sent to a higher "graveyard orbit" on 19 October 2012 around 23:00 UTC.

References

External links 
 Intelsat 5
 New Intelsat 5 Channels in New Zealand, BBC World and Australia Network

Communications satellites in geostationary orbit
Satellites using the BSS-601 bus
Spacecraft launched in 1997
Intelsat satellites